USS Wasp was a sloop that served in the U.S. Navy from 1813 to 1814.

Wasp was chartered on Lake Champlain late in the summer of 1813 and served as a tender for Commodore Thomas Macdonlough's fleet in the War of 1812 during the latter part of 1813 and into 1814. Wasp saw no combat.

As she was small and a poor sailer, the Navy returned her to her owners early in 1814. Her guns were transferred to the newly-launched schooner .

References

Sloops of the United States Navy
War of 1812 ships of the United States
Age of Sail naval ships of the United States
1813 ships